École François-Buote is a Canadian francophone school in Charlottetown, Prince Edward Island for students that attend the school come from the central parts of Queens County, including the City of Charlottetown.

The school is administratively part of the Commission scolaire de langue française. Its official colours are Blue, White and Red and the mascot is a Jaguar. The sports teams from François-Buote are called the Jaguars.

A three-year $10 million, 54,000 square foot expansion was unveiled in March 2016 by Prince Edward Island Premier Wade MacLauchlan, adding a new high school wing, additional space for an early childhood centre, a music room, science lab and a trades technology section for technical education along with an expansion of the gymnasium and cafeteria.

References

See also
List of schools in Prince Edward Island
List of school districts in Prince Edward Island

High schools in Prince Edward Island
Education in Charlottetown
Educational institutions in Canada with year of establishment missing